M'Clintock station is a flag stop railway station in M'Clintock, Manitoba, Canada.  The stop is served by Via Rail's Winnipeg – Churchill train.

Footnotes

External links 
Via Rail Station Information
Government of Manitoba Regional Map

Via Rail stations in Manitoba